Aubrey & the Three Migos Tour, presented as Aubrey & The Three Migos Tour LIVE!, was a co-headlining tour by Canadian rapper Drake, and American hip hop trio Migos. The tour began on August 12, 2018, in Kansas City, and concluded on November 18, 2018, in Atlanta.

Background
Drake and the Migos first collaborated in 2013 when Drake released a remix of the Migos song "Versace". The remix soon went viral and helped propel the Migos into mainstream success, with them later earning their first #1 single on the Billboard Hot 100 with Bad and Boujee in early 2017. Drake and Migos released their second collaboration, "Walk It Talk It", on January 26, 2018, when the Migos released their third studio album, Culture II. "Walk It Talk It" quickly became a hit and peaked at number 10 on the Billboard Hot 100.

On May 14, 2018, both acts announced they would tour together on the "Aubrey & the Three Migos Tour" in the summer and fall of 2018. The concert tour was supported by the Migos third studio album, Culture II, and Drake's fifth studio album, Scorpion, which was released a month after the tour's announcement.

Set list
This set list is representative of the show on August 12, 2018, in Kansas City.

 "8 Out of 10"
 "Talk Up"
 "Mob Ties"
 "Started From the Bottom"
 "Jumpman"
 "Both"
 "Know Yourself"
 "Emotionless"
 "Elevate"
 "Can't Take a Joke"
 "Energy"
 "Yes Indeed"
 "Free Smoke"
 "Trophies"
 "Gyalchester"
 "Crew Love"
 "Pop Style"
 "Over"
 "Headlines"
 "HYFR"
 "All Me"
 "Blessings"
 "For Free"
 "The Motto"
 "My Way (Remix)"
 "Walk It Talk It"
 "Versace"
 "Hot Summer"
 "Workin' Me"
 "Drip"
 "Stir Fry"
 "Blue Tint"
 "That's How You Feel"
 "Don't Matter to Me"
 "Rock With You"  (Michael Jackson cover) 
 "After Dark"
 "Jaded"
 "Controlla"
 "Work"
 "One Dance"
 "Hotline Bling"
 "Fake Love"
 "Nice For What"
 "In My Feelings"
 "Look Alive"
 "Sicko Mode"
 "Nonstop
 "I'm Upset"
 "Over My Dead Body"  (interlude) 
 "God's Plan"

Drake has brought out surprise guests at some of his tour dates, which includes:
Blocboy JB at the 2nd show in Chicago, Illinois, the 4th show in Inglewood, California at The Forum, & the 3rd show Atlanta, Georgia.
Tory Lanez at the 1st show in New York City.
French Montana at the 2nd show in Brooklyn, New York & the 1st show in Atlanta, Georgia.
Meek Mill at the 2nd show in Boston, Massachusetts and the 1st show in Philadelphia, Pennsylvania.
Big Freedia & Yung Miami of the duo group City Girls at the show in New Orleans, Louisiana.
Travis Scott at the 1st & 2nd show in Toronto, Ontario, the 4th show in New York City, the 2nd show in Houston, Texas, the 2nd show in Los Angeles, California, and the 3rd show in Inglewood, California at The Forum.
Drake performed “November 18th” at all 3 shows in Houston, Texas.
Sheck Wes at the 1st show in Toronto, Ontario.
Chris Brown at the 1st show in Los Angeles, California.
LeBron James at the 2nd show in Los Angeles, California.
YG at the 4th show in Inglewood, California at The Forum.
Post Malone at the 4th show in Inglewood, California at The Forum.
E-40 at the 3rd show in Oakland, California.
Too $hort at the 3rd show in Oakland, California.
Bad Bunny at the 1st show in Miami, Florida.
DJ Khaled at the 1st show in Miami, Florida.
Lil Wayne at the 1st & 2nd shows in Miami, Florida.
Lil Baby at the 3rd show in Los Angeles, California & 1st & 3rd shows in Atlanta, Georgia
Gucci Mane at the 2nd show in Atlanta, Georgia.
Trey Songz at the 3rd show in Atlanta, Georgia.
Jeezy at the 3rd show in Atlanta, Georgia.
Future at the 3rd show in Atlanta, Georgia.
 
Migos has also brought out surprise guest as well which includes:
Tee Grizzley at the 2nd show in Detroit, Michigan.
Cardi B at the 2nd show in New York City & the 3rd show in Los Angeles, California.
Rich the Kid at the 3rd show in New York City.
Tyga at the 2nd show in Las Vegas, Nevada, and the 1st show in Los Angeles, California.
Playboi Carti at the 2nd show in Los Angeles, California.
Saweetie at the First two shows in Oakland, California.
Mozzy at the 3rd show in Oakland, California.
Gucci Mane at the 1st show in Miami, Florida.
Lil Yachty at the 2nd show in Atlanta, Georgia.
21 Savage at the 3rd show in Atlanta, Georgia.

Tour dates
The following tour dates have been announced:

References 

2018 concert tours
Co-headlining concert tours
Drake (musician) concert tours
Migos